Durtro was a British independent record label established by the British poet, singer, songwriter, and visual artist David Tibet in 1988, to publish his own work and that of fellow friends and musicians.  It was replaced by one of Tibet's earlier labels, Coptic Cat, in 2010.

The label has published nearly every release of Tibet's band Current 93 since 1988. The records were distributed by World Serpent Distribution, which handled the distribution of similar artists such as Coil, Death in June, and Nurse With Wound until 2004, when World Serpent went bankrupt. After 2004, Durtro began releasing records under the name Durtro-Jnana, using Revolver USA and Cargo UK for distribution.  As of 2010, all releases were released on Coptic Cat, which was supplanted by The Spheres label in 2013.

Artists
 Marc Almond
 Antony and the Johnsons
 Baby Dee
 William Basinski
 Sveinbjörn Beinteinsson 
 Michael Cashmore
 Shirley Collins
 Chris Connelly
 Current 93
 Bill Fay
 Simon Finn
 Little Annie
 Sharron Kraus
 Pantaleimon
 Plinth
 Six Organs of Admittance
 Tiny Tim

See also
 List of record labels

References

External links
 Official website of Jnana
 Official website of Current 93
 More information on Durtro

British record labels
Vanity record labels
Experimental music record labels
Industrial record labels
Electronic music record labels
Record labels established in 1988
1988 establishments in the United Kingdom
British companies established in 1988